The following are the records of the United States in Olympic weightlifting. Records are maintained in each weight class for the snatch lift, clean and jerk lift, and the total for both lifts by the USA Weightlifting Federation.

Current records

Men

Women

Historical records

Men (1998–2018)

Women (1998–2018)

References
General
United States records 
Specific

External links
USA Weightlifting web site
Historical records

United States
records
Olympic weightlifting
Weightlifting